Boris Aleksandrovich Balashov (7 December 192720 January 1974) was Editor-in-Chief of the Soviet magazine "Filateliya SSSR" ("Philately of the USSR").

Biography 
Born in 1927 in the family of a worker. He started working at one of the Saratov plants, where he worked as a planer and, then, as an electrician.

After graduating from the Saratov State University, he was on the leading Komsomol work as a division head of the Saratov Regional Committee of VLKSM (Komsomol), and the editor of a provincial youth newspaper “Komsomolets”.

From 1958 to 1961, he worked as a head of the Press Section and, then, as a head deputy of the Propaganda and Agitation Division of the Central Committee of VLKSM.

At the later phase of his life, he was an Editor-in-Chief deputy and Editor-in-Chief for three Soviet magazines including "Filateliya SSSR" (1968–1974).

See also 
 Filateliya

References

External links 
 

1927 births
1974 deaths
Male journalists
Soviet journalists
Russian philatelists
Philately of the Soviet Union
Komsomol
20th-century journalists